Dennis Retera (born 11 July 1986 in Best, North Brabant) is a Dutch racing driver currently competing in the International GT Open. Retera has raced in the International Formula Master, Formula Renault 2.0 and other racing series. In 2008 Retera joined A1 Team Netherlands as a test driver.

Career
After a successful karting career with various Rotax Max championships Retera made his car racing debut in the Dutch and Benelux Formula Ford Zetec championships. Retera won both championships in the First Division, for older Formula Ford cars. The Dutchman finished third in the overall championship for both the Dutch and Benelux series. The following year Retera signed by the well renowned Geva Racing. This time Retera won the overall titles of both the Dutch and Benelux championships. The Dutchman also achieved a podium position at the prestigious Formula Ford Festival. After starting from pole position Retera finished third, behind Duncan Tappy and Charlie Donnelly.

In 2006 Retera raced in a variety of series, most notably the British Formula Three Championship. Retera competed in the first three raceweekends of the series. At Donington Park the Dutchman scored his best result, finishing fifth. Retera also entered the two races of the Formula Renault 2.0 Northern European Cup at TT Circuit Assen retiring from both races. For 2007 Retera returned to the series to compete full-time entered by AR Motorsport. After a promising start with two top ten finishes Retera did not achieve any more top ten finishes. The driver from Best ended up twelfth in the final standings.

For 2008 Retera focussed on GT racing, more specifically the GT4 European Series. He competed in the Light class in a KTM X-Bow entered by Reiter Engineering. Retera competed eight races of which he won five. He and his teammate, Christopher Haase, finished runner-up in the championship. At the end of the 2008 season Retera was signed as the official rookie driver for A1 Team Netherlands. Retera drove the Ferrari A1 08 at the Friday practice sessions. Retera's strongest session was at the season finale at Brands Hatch. Retera was classified fourth in the rookie session.

2009 saw the Dutchman racing in his native BRL V6 series. Retera won one race in the Ford Mondeo based stock car racing series. Retera also competed in the International Formula Master for his old team, AR Motorsport. In his second race, at Pau, Retera finished second behind Alessandro Kouzkin. For 2010 the Dutch driver joined Callaway Competition in the FIA GT3 European Championship and ADAC GT Masters. With technical difficulties plaguing the Chevrolet Corvette Z06.R Retera failed to achieve noticeable results. He turned to his native Dutch GT4 for 2010 with co-driver Jan Joris Verheul in a Rhesus Racing entered Aston Martin Vantage. The Dutchman achieved eight podium finishes throughout the fourteen-race season. Retera was classified fourth in the championship standings.

In 2012 Retera ran part-time schedules in the Blancpain Endurance Series and ADAC GT Masters. For 2014 the Dutchman returned to full-time racing, in the International GT Open in a Chevrolet Corvette Z06. At the Hungaroring and the Nürburgring the Dutch driver finished third. He was classified 21st in the championship.

Motorsports results

Complete A1 Grand Prix results
(key) (Races in bold indicate pole position) (Races in italics indicate fastest lap)

References

External links
 

1986 births
People from Best, Netherlands
Formula Ford drivers
British Formula Three Championship drivers
Formula Renault 2.0 NEC drivers
Blancpain Endurance Series drivers
European Le Mans Series drivers
International GT Open drivers
International Formula Master drivers
A1 Grand Prix Rookie drivers
Living people
T-Sport drivers
Sportspeople from North Brabant
24H Series drivers